Robert Bertrand "Bob" Blanchet (born February 24, 1954) is a Canadian former professional ice hockey player who played in the World Hockey Association (WHA). Drafted in the seventeenth round of the 1974 NHL amateur draft by the Washington Capitals, Blanchet opted to play in the WHA after being selected by the San Diego Mariners in the fourteenth round of the 1974 WHA Amateur Draft. He played parts of two seasons for the Mariners.

Awards
1974–75 NAHL Second All-Star Team

References

External links

1954 births
Canadian ice hockey goaltenders
Charlotte Checkers (SHL) players
Ice hockey people from Quebec
Kitchener Rangers players
Living people
Oklahoma City Blazers (1965–1977) players
People from Abitibi-Témiscamingue
People from Rouyn-Noranda
San Diego Mariners draft picks
San Diego Mariners players
Syracuse Blazers players
Washington Capitals draft picks
Canadian expatriate ice hockey players in the United States